Win Stoller is a Republican member of the Illinois Senate from the 37th district. The 37th district, located in Central Illinois, includes all or parts of Mercer, Lee, Bureau, Henry, Knox, Stark, Peoria, Woodford and Marshall counties.

Win Stoller was sworn on January 5, 2021, allowing him to serve in the 101st General Assembly's lame duck session. Stoller is a longtime resident of Germantown Hills, Illinois.

Stoller has a Bachelor of Science in accountancy and a Master of Business Administration, both from the University of Illinois Urbana-Champaign.

Stoller currently serves on the following committees: State Government (Minority Spokesperson); Environment and Conservation; Higher Education; Pensions; Public Safety; Transportation; Insurance; App-Emergency Management; App-Health; App- Revenue and Finance; App- State Law Enforcement (Sub-Minority Spokesperson); Redistricting- Northern Illinois.

References

Republican Party Illinois state senators
Businesspeople from Illinois
21st-century American politicians
People from Woodford County, Illinois
University of Illinois alumni
Living people
Year of birth missing (living people)